Chris Cleave (born 1973) is a British writer and journalist.

Biography
Cleave was born in London on 14 May 1973, brought up in Cameroon and Buckinghamshire, and educated at Dr Challoner's Grammar School and Balliol College, Oxford where he studied experimental psychology. He lives in the UK with his French wife and three children.

Writing
Cleave's debut novel Incendiary was published in twenty countries and has been adapted into a feature film starring Michelle Williams and Ewan McGregor. The novel won a 2006 Somerset Maugham Award and was shortlisted for the 2006 Commonwealth Writers' Prize. The audio book version was read by Australian actor, Susan Lyons

His second novel, The Other Hand, was released in August 2008 and was described as "A powerful piece of art... shocking, exciting and deeply affecting... superb" by The Independent. It has been shortlisted for the 2008 Costa Book Awards in the Novel category. Cleave was inspired to write The Other Hand from his childhood in West Africa. It was released in the US and Canada in January 2009 under the title Little Bee.

Gold, his third novel, was called "bold and brave" by The Observer.

Cleave is a columnist for The Guardian newspaper in London. From 2008 until 2010 he wrote a column for The Guardian entitled "Down with the kids".

Novels
 Incendiary  (2005)
 The Other Hand  (UK title, Sceptre, August 2008), published as Little Bee in the United States and Canada.
 Gold (June 2012)
 Everyone Brave Is Forgiven (April 2016)

Short stories
 "Quiet Time" 
 "Fresh Water" 
 "Oyster"

References

External links

Guardian columns
Washington Post on 'Incendiary'
Interview with the Irish Tribune
Chris Cleave at Random House
Video interview on his book, Little Bee

1973 births
Living people
Alumni of Balliol College, Oxford
21st-century English novelists
Postmodern writers
People educated at Dr Challoner's Grammar School
English male novelists
21st-century English male writers